Akhtsu Tunnel is a tunnel on the road between Adler and Krasnaya Polyana (motorway A148) in the Adlersky City District of Sochi, Russia. It goes through the mountain massive on the left bank of the Mzymta River, in the Akhtsu Gorge.

The length of the tunnel is 2625.7 m. The width is 7 m.

The tunnel was built between 1999–2005. It was opened on 19 August 2005 by Russian President Vladimir Putin.

References

Road tunnels in Russia
Sochi
Tunnels completed in 2005
Buildings and structures in Krasnodar Krai
Transport in Krasnodar Krai